Craig Raymond Coxe (born January 21, 1964) is an American former professional ice hockey player. In addition to playing in the National Hockey League (NHL) with the Vancouver Canucks, Calgary Flames, St. Louis Blues, and the San Jose Sharks. Coxe also played two seasons of major league roller hockey in the RHI, after having grown up playing hockey in Tucson, Arizona, from 1969 to 1975 and in Laguna Beach, California. He lives in the suburbs of Saint Ignace, Michigan.

Playing career
Coxe was selected in fourth round (66th overall) in the 1982 NHL Entry Draft by the Detroit Red Wings. Unable to come to terms with Detroit, he became an unrestricted free agent after the 1983–84 season and signed with the Vancouver Canucks.

Coxe played for four different NHL teams over eight seasons in the NHL. Best known as an enforcer, Coxe played in 235 NHL regular season games, scoring 45 points and receiving  713 minutes in penalties. Coxe was suspended for the first three games of the 1987–88 NHL season for leaving the penalty box to fight Joe Paterson during a pre-season game against the Los Angeles Kings.

While perhaps best remembered as a member of the Vancouver Canucks, Coxe was claimed from the Canucks by the San Jose Sharks in the 1991 NHL Dispersal and Expansion Drafts and, on October 4, 1991, he scored the first goal in the Sharks' franchise history. It was the next-to-last goal that he  scored in the NHL.

Coxe vs. Probert
Coxe was known as a willing fighter at the NHL level. Coxe's fights with Bob Probert are considered classics and have been referred to as "two of the biggest toe to toe slugfests of all time".

Coaching career
During the 1999–00 season, his final year as a player, Coxe was playing with the San Antonio Iguanas in the CHL. Before the season's end, Coxe was named the assistant coach for the team. The following season Coxe was named head coach of the CHL's Huntsville Tornado. Coxe was also the head coach of the CHL's El Paso Buzzards for their final season in 2002–03. During this season, the team's owner, Bill Davidson, had declared bankruptcy. Despite not being paid for over a month, and even though at times he was able to dress only 9 or 10 players, Coxe continued to coach the team to the season's end.  He is currently the head hockey coach at Cheboygan Area High School in Cheboygan, Michigan.  He is also the rink manager at the Ralph G. Cantile Arena in Cheboygan.

Career statistics

Regular season and playoffs

References

External links 

1964 births
American men's ice hockey centers
Belleville Bulls players
Calgary Flames players
Cincinnati Cyclones (IHL) players
Corpus Christi Icerays players
Detroit Red Wings draft picks
Fredericton Express players
Huntsville Channel Cats (SHL) players
Ice hockey players from California
Kalamazoo Wings (1974–2000) players
Kansas City Blades players
Living people
Milwaukee Admirals (IHL) players
Peoria Rivermen (IHL) players
Phoenix Cobras players
San Antonio Iguanas players
San Jose Sharks players
St. Albert Saints players
St. Louis Blues players
Sportspeople from Chula Vista, California
Tulsa Oilers (1992–present) players
Vancouver Canucks players
Vancouver VooDoo players
Wichita Thunder players
People from Cheboygan, Michigan
People from St. Ignace, Michigan